The Gemmatimonadota are a phylum of bacteria established in 2003. The phylum contains two classes Gemmatimonadetes and Longimicrobia.

Species
The type species Gemmatimonas aurantiaca strain T-27T was isolated from activated sludge in a sewage treatment system in 2003. It is a Gram-negative bacterium able to grow by both aerobic and anaerobic respiration.

The second cultured species was Gemmatirosa kalamazoonensis gen. nov., sp. nov. strain KBS708, which was isolated from organically managed agricultural soil in Michigan USA.
  
The third cultured species Gemmatimonas phototrophica strain AP64T was isolated from a shallow freshwater desert lake Tiān é hú (Swan Lake) in North China. A unique feature of this organism is the presence of bacterial photosynthetic reaction centers. It probably acquired genes for anoxygenic photosynthesis via horizontal gene transfer. G. phototrophica is a facultative photoheterotrophic organism. It requires the supply of organic substrate for growth, but it may obtain additional energy for its metabolism from light.

Longimicrobium terrae strain CB-286315T was isolated from a soil sample from a typical Mediterranean forest ecosystem located in Granada, Spain. Due to this large phylogenetic distance from other cultured Gemmatimonades, it established a novel class named Longimicrobia.

Environmental distribution
Data from culture-independent studies indicate that Gemmatimonadota are widely distributed in many natural habitats. They make up about 2% of soil bacterial communities and has been identified as one of the top nine phyla found in soils; yet, there are currently only six cultured isolates. Gemmatimonadota have been found in a variety of arid soils, such as grassland, prairie, and pasture soil, as well as eutrophic lake sediments and alpine soils. This wide range of environments where Gemmatimonadota have been found suggests an adaptation to low soil moisture. A study conducted showed that the distribution of the Gemmatimonadota in soil tends to be more dependent on the moisture availability than aggregation, reinforcing the belief that the members of this phylum prefer dryer soils. Smaller numbers were also found in various aquatic environments, such as fresh waters and sediments.

Phylogeny

Taxonomy
The currently accepted taxonomy is based on the List of Prokaryotic names with Standing in Nomenclature (LSPN) and National Center for Biotechnology Information.

 Phylum Gemmatimonadota Zhang et al. 2003
 Class Gemmatimonadetes Zhang et al. 2003 ["Gemmatimonadia" Oren, Parte & Garrity 2016 ex Cavalier-Smith 2020]
 Order Gemmatimonadales Zhang et al. 2003
 Family Gemmatimonadaceae Zhang et al. 2003
 Genus Roseisolibacter Pascual et al. 2018
 Species R. agri Pascual et al. 2018
 Genus "Gemmatirosa" DeBruyn et al. 2013
 Species G. kalamazoonesis DeBruyn et al. 2013
 Genus Gemmatimonas Zhang et al. 2003 em. Zeng et al. 2015
 Species G. aurantiaca Zhang et al. 2003 em. Zeng et al. 2015
 Species G. phototrophica Zeng et al. 2015
 Class Longimicrobia Pascual et al. 2016
 Order Longimicrobiales Pascual et al. 2016
 Family Longimicrobiaceae Pascual et al. 2016
 Genus Longimicrobium Pascual et al. 2016
 Species L. terrae Pascual et al. 2016

See also
 List of bacterial orders
 List of bacteria genera

References

External links 
 Brief taxonomy
 Fawaz, M. N. (2013). Revealing the Ecological Role of Gemmatimonadetes Through Cultivation and Molecular Analysis of Agricultural Soils. 44–60. Brief review of the phylum.

 
Bacteria phyla